The history of West Bengal began in 1947, when the Hindu-dominated western part of British Bengal Province became the Indian state of West Bengal.

When India gained independence in 1947, Bengal was partitioned along religious lines. The western part went to India (and was named West Bengal) while the eastern part joined Pakistan as a province called East Bengal (later renamed East Pakistan, giving rise to independent Bangladesh in 1971).

Bidhan Chadra Roy Era (1947–1962)

Princely state merge with West Bengal
In 1950, the Princely State of Koch Bihar merged with West Bengal after King Jagaddipendra Narayan had signed the Instrument of Accession with India. In 1955, the former French enclave of Chandannagar, which had passed into Indian control after 1950, was integrated into West Bengal. Portions of Bihar were subsequently merged with West Bengal.

During Roy's Chief Minister-ship very few manufacturing industries were set up in the state. In 1954, when Dr. B. C. Roy was the Congress chief minister, a massive food crisis overtook the state. There was a near-famine condition in Bengal.

United Front (1967)

1967 General Election

After the state legislative elections held in 1967, the CPI(M) was the main force behind the United Front government formed. The Chief Ministership was given to Ajoy Mukherjee of the Bangla Congress.

Naxalbari uprising

In 1967 a peasant uprising broke out in Naxalbari, in northern West Bengal. The insurgency was led by hardline district-level CPI(M) leaders Charu Majumdar and Kanu Sanyal. The Naxalbari movement was violently repressed by the West Bengal government. During the 1970s and 1980s, severe power shortages, strikes and a violent Marxist-Naxalite movement damaged much of the state's infrastructure, leading to a period of economic stagnation.

The Bangladesh Liberation War of 1971 resulted in the influx of millions of refugees to West Bengal, causing significant strains on its infrastructure. The 1974 smallpox epidemic killed thousands. West Bengal politics underwent a major change when the Left Front won the 1977 assembly election, defeating the incumbent Indian National Congress. The Left Front, led by Communist Party of India (Marxist), has governed for the state for the subsequent three decades.

Dismissal of United Front government
In November 1967, the West Bengal United Front government was dismissed by the central government. Initially the Indian National Congress formed a minority government led by Prafulla Chandra Ghosh, but that cabinet did not last long. Following the proclamation that the United Front government had been dislodged, a 48-hour hartal was effective throughout the state. After the fall of the Ghosh cabinet, the state was put under President's Rule.

1969 Assembly election
Fresh elections were held in West Bengal in 1969. CPI(M) emerged as the largest party in the West Bengal legislative assembly.  But with the active support of CPI and the Bangla Congress, Ajoy Mukherjee was returned as Chief Minister of the state. Mukherjee resigned on March 16, 1970 and the state was put under President's Rule.

Shiddharthrasankar Ray Era (1972–1977)
Indian National Congress the 1972 assembly election, and its leader Siddhartha Shankar Ray became the chief minister. During this period, the then Prime Minister of India, Indira Gandhi proclaimed nationwide Emergency in 1975.

This period was marked by large scale violence as the police force battled with the naxalites and ultimately crushed the movement in the state.

Left Front era

Jyoti Basu (1977–2000)

1977 Election
In the 1977 election of the state legislature, the Left Front, headed by Communist Party of India (Marxist), won 243 seats thereby gaining a majority. The first Left Front government was established with Jyoti Basu as the Chief Minister.

Marichjhanpi Massacre, 1979
The massacre in Marichjhanpi, which took place under CPI(M) rule in Bengal between January 26 and May 16, 1979, relates to the forcible eviction of refugees who had fled from East Pakistan thereby leading to the death of a sizable population among them.

After leading the Left Front government for consecutive five terms, Jyoti Basu retired from active politics and Buddhadeb Bhattacharjee was appointed as his successor. Five years later, the Left Front came back to the power with Bhattacharjee again assuming the office of the Chief Minister.

Budhdhadev Bhattacharya (2000–2011)
The state's economic recovery gathered momentum after economic reforms in India were introduced in the early 1990s by the central government, aided by election of a new reformist Chief Minister Buddhadeb Bhattacharya in 2000. As of 2007, armed activists have been organizing terrorist attacks in some parts of the state, while clashes with the administration have taken place at several sensitive places on the issue of industrial land acquisition.

Nandigram violence

The Nandigram violence was an incident in Nandigram, West Bengal where, on the orders of the Left Front government, more than 4,000 heavily armed police stormed the Nandigram area with the aim of stamping out protests against the West Bengal government's plans to expropriate  of land for a Special Economic Zone (SEZ) to be developed by the Indonesian-based Salim Group. The police shot dead at least 14 villagers and wounded 70 more.

The SEZ controversy started when the government of West Bengal decided that the Salim Group of Indonesia would set up a chemical hub under the SEZ policy at Nandigram, a rural area in the district of Purba Medinipur. The villagers took over the administration of the area and all the roads to the villages were cut off. A front-page story in the  Kolkata newspaper, The Telegraph, on 4 January 2007 was headlined, "False alarm sparks clash". According to the newspaper that village council meeting at which the alleged land seizure was to be announced was actually a meeting to declare Nandigram a "clean village", that is, a village in which all the households had access to toilet facilities.

Trinamool Congress era
In the 2011 West Bengal Legislative Assembly election, Left Front was defeated and Trinamool Congress won an absolute majority of seats. Mamata Banerjee, the leader of Trinamool Congress, became the chief minister. The success of Trinamool Congress was repeated in the 2013 Panchayat election (local government elections in rural areas, and some urban municipalities) and the 2014 Indian general election (in which Trinamool won 34 of 42 Lok Sabha constituencies in the state).

Notes

External links

 Government
 Official website of Government of West Bengal
 Statistical handbook West Bengal
 West Bengal Government Information Commission
 Directorate of Census Operations of West Bengal
 Other
 
 *
 West-Bengal Refugees and Political Activists Oral History Collection at the International Institute of Social History — Interviews  with Bengali refugees and political activists, covering the period 1947-1970